The 1985 Canadian Grand Prix was a Formula One motor race held at Circuit Gilles Villeneuve in Montreal on 16 June 1985. It was the fifth race of the 1985 Formula One World Championship.

The 70-lap race was won by Italian driver Michele Alboreto, driving a Ferrari, with Swedish teammate Stefan Johansson second and Frenchman Alain Prost third in a McLaren-TAG. The win gave Alboreto the lead of the Drivers' Championship by five points from Prost and fellow Italian Elio de Angelis, who finished fifth in his Lotus-Renault having started from pole position, while Ferrari took the lead of the Constructors' Championship.

Qualifying

Qualifying report
Qualifying saw Elio de Angelis take pole position in his Lotus by just under three-tenths of a second from teammate Ayrton Senna, with the Ferraris of Michele Alboreto and Stefan Johansson immediately behind them on the second row. Alain Prost was fifth in his McLaren, with Derek Warwick sixth in the factory Renault. The top ten was completed by Thierry Boutsen in the Arrows, Keke Rosberg in the Williams, Nelson Piquet in the Brabham and Patrick Tambay in the second factory Renault. Reigning World Champion Niki Lauda could only manage 17th in the second McLaren, one place behind Nigel Mansell in the second Williams.

Qualifying classification

Race

Race report
At the start, de Angelis led away from Senna and Alboreto. Warwick made a fast start to run fourth, before suffering handling problems. On lap 6 Senna pitted with a turbo problem, losing five laps in the process. Alboreto then closed up to de Angelis, before passing him for the lead on lap 13. In mid-race, Johansson also passed de Angelis to set up a Ferrari 1-2, while Lauda retired with an engine failure after a "disappointing weekend." Alboreto eventually took the chequered flag 1.9 seconds ahead of Johansson, with Prost and Rosberg moving into third and fourth respectively in the closing laps, and de Angelis having to settle for fifth, ahead of Mansell. Johansson had to contend with an intermittent misfire and when he got too close to Alboreto, the team leader simply turned up the turbo pressure and pulled away. Both de Angelis and Prost had to slow down considerably so as to not run out of fuel (with Prost having to stop almost immediately after crossing the finishing line).

Race classification

Championship standings after the race

Drivers' Championship standings

Constructors' Championship standings

References

Canadian Grand Prix
Grand Prix
Canadian Grand Prix
Grand Prix